Lisa Jane Riley (born 13 July 1976) is an English actress, comedian and television presenter. Riley is best known for portraying the role of Mandy Dingle in the ITV soap opera Emmerdale between 1995 and 2001, and from 2019 onwards. She also replaced Jeremy Beadle as the presenter of You've Been Framed! between 1998 and 2002. She was also a contestant on the tenth series of Strictly Come Dancing, and a panellist on the ITV daytime series Loose Women.

Career
Riley trained at the Oldham Theatre Workshop from the age of nine, and was signed by an agent three years later. Riley's early roles included appearances as an extra in both Coronation Street and Brookside as well as a cast member in Butterfly Kiss which was directed by Michael Winterbottom. She then appeared in a guest role as Mandy Dingle in the British soap opera Emmerdale in 1995. After proving popular with the audience, Riley was invited to join the soap's regular cast the following year. In 1996, Riley won the National Television Awards for "Most Popular Newcomer" for her work in Emmerdale. She continued to play Mandy until 2001 after deciding to pursue other television roles.

Riley portrayed Princess Jean in the CITV Awards 1997, and also presented You've Been Framed! between 1998 and 2002, taking over from the former presenter, Jeremy Beadle and raising viewers figures to more than 13 million at its peak in the process. Riley even appeared on You've Been Framed! herself, in a clip one of her old school friends sent to the show, which the crew didn't tell her about beforehand.

In 1999, Riley co-presented the six-part ITV series Birthrace 2000 with Davina McCall, which featured couples trying to have the first baby of the millennium.

Riley featured as Rebecca Patterson, a "shy, retiring, twenty something" woman, in the drama series Fat Friends across three series between 2002 and 2005. Riley portrayed Goody McEldrich in a 2011 episode of the UK children's show 'Young Dracula', and during 2012, she appeared as Nadia Hicks in the second series of ITV crime drama, Scott & Bailey. Between 2011 and 2013, Riley made guest appearance as Tina Allen in the BBC school drama Waterloo Road. Later that year, Riley signed up as a contestant on the tenth series of Strictly Come Dancing, partnering with Robin Windsor. Riley juggled the rehearsals for Strictly Come Dancing with filming two appearances for Waterloo Road in February 2013. The couple were eliminated during the semi-finals, on 16 December 2012. She has since appeared on the 2013 live tour and the backstage show Strictly Confidential, directed by Craig Revel Horwood, who often praised her on the show.

In September 2016, it was announced that Riley had joined the ITV daytime series Loose Women as one of three new panellists, following a series of guest appearances during the year. In May 2017, Riley featured in the BBC miniseries Three Girls as Lorna, the mother of one of the main characters. In August 2018, Riley starred in another BBC drama, Age Before Beauty, as Tina Reegan, a gothic tattoo artist. Riley's return to Emmerdale for one storyline was announced on 13 November 2018. The character returned for a guest stint from January 2019. She later returned full-time from September 2019.

Personal life
In late 2016, Riley lost over 10 stone in weight, and a year later, she had a surgery to remove excess skin. Riley describes herself as a "dedicated vegetarian".

Filmography

Theatre

Film

Television

 Guest appearances
 This Morning (2001, 2012, 2013, 2019, 2020)
 The Alan Titchmarsh Show (2009)
 The Wright Stuff (2009) – Guest panellist
 Strictly Come Dancing: It Takes Two (2012, 2013, 2014)
 Let's Dance for Sport Relief (2013)
 Lorraine (2013, 2016, 2018, 2020)
 Keep It in the Family (2015)

Awards and nominations

See also
 List of Strictly Come Dancing contestants

References

External links
 
 

1976 births
English television presenters
English soap opera actresses
English television actresses
English stage actresses
Living people
People from Bury, Greater Manchester